An eyrie  (a variant of aerie) is a bird nest of an eagle, falcon, hawk, or other bird of prey.

Eyrie may also refer to:

Places
Eyrie Bay, a bay in Antarctica
Glen Eyrie, a castle near Colorado Springs, Colorado
The Eyrie Vineyards, an American winery in Oregon

Arts, entertainment, and media
Eyrie (novel), a novel by Tim Winton
"Hope Eyrie" (a.k.a. "The Eagle Has Landed"), a song by Leslie Fish
The Eyrie, a castle in A Song of Ice and Fire and its TV adaptation Game of Thrones

See also
Aerie (disambiguation)
Eagle's Nest (disambiguation)
Eerie, an American magazine of horror comics
Erie, Pennsylvania
Ireland or Éire
Snowdonia or Eryri
Jean-Baptiste Benoît Eyriès (1767–1846), French geographer, author and translator